The Berlin Kulturbrauerei (literally "Culture Brewery") is a  building complex in Berlin, Germany. Originally built and operated as a brewery, its courtyards and unique architecture have been protected as a monument since 1974 and it is one of the few well-preserved examples of industrial architecture in Berlin dating from the end of the 19th century.

It is supported by the Treuhandliegenschaftsgesellschaft (TLG) and operated commercially as a cultural centre in the Kollwitz neighborhood of the Prenzlauer Berg district (Borough of Pankow). It provides cinemas, theatres, clubs and function rooms. It is situated close to the Eberswalder Straße U-Bahn station.

Kulturbrauerei today
Today, regular events, concerts and festivals take place at Kulturbrauerei. Some organisations that settled on the site of the former brewery complex are:

 Kino in der Kulturbrauerei, cinema with eight screens, one of Berlin's first run theatres
 Theater RambaZamba
 P.A.N.D.A. Nicht nur Russisches Theater, event location for Russian concerts, reading etc.
 Literaturwerkstatt Berlin/lyrikline.org
 office and studio of the band 17 Hippies
 Restaurant frannz and frannz Klub (formerly known as Franz-Club)
 Kesselhaus in der Kulturbrauerei|Kesselhaus, event location
 Alte Kantine, event location
 Soda Club, dance club
 Club 23, dance club
 Palais, event location
 Schule für Bildende Kunst und Gestaltung, art school
 Museum in the Kulturbrauerei, museum on everyday life in the GDR, Haus der Geschichte foundation
 Ch. Links Verlag, publishing house
 be.bra verlag, publishing house
 New York University, Berlin branch
 Berlin on Bike, organizer of bicycle tours
 TIC Tourist Information Center
 Quandoo, restaurant reservation platform

References

External links

 Kulturbrauerei website (English version)
 Berlin on Bike website
 Soda Club at Kulturbrauerei in Berlin 

Architecture in Germany
Buildings and structures in Pankow